Podgora is a rural locality (a village) in Kosinskoye Rural Settlement, Kosinsky District, Perm Krai, Russia. The population was 51 as of 2010. There are 2 streets.

Geography 
Podgora is located 38 km north of Kosa (the district's administrative centre) by road. Pyatigory is the nearest rural locality.

References 

Rural localities in Kosinsky District